is a set of physical exercises that are part of judo.

Its purpose is to promote the development of strong, healthy minds and bodies in an interesting and useful way.
It consists of two groups of exercises, one to be practiced alone, the other with a partner.

References 

 Jigoro Kano, Kodokan Judo, Kodansha International.

Judo kata